Transversality may refer to:
 Transversality (mathematics), a notion in mathematics
 Transversality theorem, a theorem in differential topology

See also
Transverse (disambiguation)
Transversal (disambiguation)
Longitudinal (disambiguation)